Starbuck Township is a civil township in Bottineau County in the U.S. state of North Dakota. At the 2010 census, its population was 32.

References

Townships in Bottineau County, North Dakota